Dandridge is a town in and the county seat of Jefferson County, Tennessee, United States. It had a population of 3,344 at the 2020 census. The town is part of the Morristown, Tennessee Metropolitan Statistical Area, which consists of Jefferson, Hamblen, and Grainger counties.

It is considered a suburb of Knoxville based on its proximity to the city, and the connection between the two via Interstate 40.

Dandridge bills itself as the "second oldest town in Tennessee" (behind only Jonesborough in Washington County). Most of the downtown area of Dandridge sits below the high level water mark of Douglas Lake and is protected by a levee made out of stone.

History
In the 16th century, a substantial Native American chiefdom known as Chiaha was located on Zimmerman's Island, just southwest of Dandridge along the French Broad River. Spanish explorer Hernando de Soto spent several weeks at Chiaha in 1540, and Juan Pardo built a small fort near the chiefdom's main village in 1567. Both expeditions were en route to the chiefdom of Coosa in what is now Georgia. Zimmerman's Island is now submerged by Douglas Lake.

The first Euro-American settlers arrived in Dandridge in 1783. In 1793, the town was officially named the county seat of Jefferson County, which had been created the previous year. The town was named for Martha Dandridge Washington, the wife of the first president of the United States.

On December 24, 1863, at the height of the Civil War, a skirmish occurred at Dandridge as Confederate General James Longstreet and Union General Ambrose Burnside struggled for control of Knoxville. As Longstreet's army retreated to Morristown, a detachment of his army intercepted and routed a pursuing Union brigade just north of Dandridge. The Union troops were forced to fall back to New Market.

The construction of Douglas Dam on the French Broad River in 1942 proposed to flood almost all of downtown Dandridge, which was situated below the proposed reservoir's high-water mark. Residents of the town successfully petitioned then First Lady Eleanor Roosevelt, pointing out that Dandridge was the only town in the United States named for the wife of George Washington. The Tennessee Valley Authority constructed a levee between downtown Dandridge and the reservoir.  The levee rises almost immediately behind the Town Hall, and runs roughly parallel to Main Street.

In 1975, Interstate 40 would be completed north of Dandridge, prompting town officials to annex the corridor of I-40 at exit 412 where it shares an interchange with SR 92.

In 2015, the Town of Dandridge began efforts to revitalize its downtown area and its waterfront. These plans include a public dock across the SR 92 bridge in Dandridge on TWRA owned land, improved bicycle and pedestrian access, a floating amphitheater, civic space, a swimming area, a farmer's market pavilion, commercial development space, and a hotel-conference center. The project is expected to be complete in the early to mid 2020s.

Geography
Dandridge is located south of the center of Jefferson County at  (36.028493, -83.424010).

Major highways

Demographics

2020 census

As of the 2020 United States census, there were 3,344 people, 1,107 households, and 796 families residing in the town.

2010 census
As of the census of 2010, there were 2,721 people, 833 households, and 516 families residing in the town. The population density was 509 people per square mile (196.5/km2). There were 833 housing units at an average density of 156.0 per square mile (61.8/km2). The racial makeup of the town was 92.44% White, 6.54% African American, 0.24% Native American, 0.05% Asian, 0.19% from other races, and 0.53% from two or more races. Hispanic or Latino of any race were 0.96% of the population.

There were 749 households, out of which 27.9% had children under the age of 18 living with them, 54.7% were married couples living together, 11.5% had a female householder with no husband present, and 31.0% were non-families. 28.3% of all households were made up of individuals, and 10.8% had someone living alone who was 65 years of age or older. The average household size was 2.30 and the average family size was 2.81.

In the town, the population was spread out, with 24.0% under the age of 18, 7.8% from 18 to 24, 26.3% from 25 to 44, 21.8% from 45 to 64, and 20.2% who were 65 years of age or older. The median age was 39 years. For every 100 females, there were 100.2 males. For every 100 females age 18 and over, there were 87.4 males.

The median income for a household in the town was $34,167, and the median income for a family was $40,357. Males had a median income of $31,667 versus $21,176 for females. The per capita income for the town was $19,753. About 9.4% of families and 13.1% of the population were below the poverty line, including 18.4% of those under age 18 and 10.8% of those age 65 or over.

Notable people
John Caspar Branner (1850–1922), geologist
Mr. Fuji (1935–2016), professional wrestler
Norman C. Gaddis (b. 1923), Air Force general and POW
Hugh T. Inman (1846–1910), entrepreneur and cotton merchant
John H. Inman (1844–1896), entrepreneur
Samuel M. Inman (1843–1915), entrepreneur and cotton merchant
Kane (b. 1967), mayor of Knox County, professional wrestler, actor, and insurer
Peter Malnati (b. 1987), professional golfer
James Henry Randolph (1825–1900), congressman
John Rankin (1795–1886), abolitionist

References

External links

 
Jefferson County Chamber of Commerce
Town charter
  Jefferson County's Standard Banner newspaper

Towns in Jefferson County, Tennessee
Towns in Tennessee
County seats in Tennessee
Morristown metropolitan area, Tennessee
Populated places established in 1793